FC South End was a football team from Trinidad and Tobago based in Point Fortin/La Brea and is a former member of the TT Pro League, the highest level of football in Trinidad.

History
Founded in 2008, it played its home games at the Manny Ramjohn Stadium.

References

Football clubs in Trinidad and Tobago
Association football clubs established in 2008
2008 establishments in Trinidad and Tobago
2011 disestablishments in Trinidad and Tobago
Association football clubs disestablished in 2011